Andrew Osmond may refer to:
 Andrew Osmond (novelist)
 Andrew Osmond (satirist)